Edmond Valléry Gressier (21 December 1813, Corbie – 1 November 1892) was a French lawyer, senator for Somme (and President of its General Council) and the Minister of Agriculture of France during the Franco-Prussian War.

References

1813 births
1892 deaths
People from Corbie
Politicians from Hauts-de-France
Bonapartists
French Ministers of Agriculture and Commerce
French Ministers of Public Works
Members of the 3rd Corps législatif of the Second French Empire
French Senators of the Second Empire